Morgan Jones 1677 Pottery Kiln is a historic archaeological site located near Glebe Harbor and Hague, Westmoreland County, Virginia. The site was excavated in 1973, by staff from the Virginia Department of Historic Resources.  It includes the remains of a pottery kiln operated by Morgan Jones and Dennis White in 1677.  The site has kiln remains and many fragmentary samples of the pottery manufactured there.

It was listed on the National Register of Historic Places in 1974.

References

External links
"Excavation of a Seventeenth Century Pottery Kiln at Glebe Harbor, Westmoreland County, Virginia," William M. Kelso and Edward A. Chappell, Historical Archaeology 1974.
MarkerHistory.com

Archaeological sites on the National Register of Historic Places in Virginia
National Register of Historic Places in Westmoreland County, Virginia
1677 establishments in Virginia